Eichfeld is a town in the district of Südoststeiermark in Styria in Austria. The villages of Hainsdorf-Brunnsee and Oberrakitsch are located within the town. On 1 January 2015, administrative reform actions in Styria merged the towns of Mureck, Gosdorf, and Eichfeld, which includes the villages of Hainsdorf-Brunnsee and Oberrakitsch. The new municipality is called Mureck.

Population

References

Cities and towns in Südoststeiermark District